The .38-40 Winchester is actually a .40 caliber (10 mm) cartridge shooting .401" (10.2 mm) caliber bullets.  The cartridge was introduced by Winchester in 1874 and is derived from their .44-40 Winchester. This cartridge was introduced for rifles, but in its reintroduction for Cowboy Action Shooting it has seen some popularity as a revolver cartridge. It is not particularly well suited to hunting larger game, but it was popular when it was introduced, along with the previous .44-40 Winchester, for deer hunting.  It can be used successfully on smaller game animals, and for self-defense. Current loadings are intended for revolvers.

Design and history

It is unclear why this cartridge was introduced, as it is very similar to the .44-40 from which it was derived. It has approximately  less muzzle energy, and has a muzzle velocity about  less than the .44-40. The goal may have been to reduce recoil while maintaining a similar bullet sectional density. One unusual design element of this cartridge is that factory ammunition was loaded with a different case profile than the standard chamber for this cartridge, factory ammunition having a much longer neck than the standard chamber. Most reloading dies are designed to size fired brass to the chamber specification rather than that of the original factory ammunition case profile.

The renewed interest in this caliber can be explained by the increasing popularity of cowboy action shooting and metallic silhouette shooting. Several single-action revolvers have recently been chambered for this cartridge, including the Ruger Vaquero. Most modern reloading data for this cartridge is found in the handgun section of reloading manuals.

Performance
Though introduced as an "all-around" cartridge, traditional sources suggest the .38–40 performs inadequately on deer. Ballistically, commercial 'cowboy' loads are similar to the much newer .40 S&W, sharing the same bullet diameter, bullet weight, and similar velocity. A limited number of 'hunting' loads are available commercially, which produce about 25% more muzzle energy than the more common target ammunition.

Dimensions

Synonyms
.38-40
.38-40 WCF
.38 CFW
.38 WCF

See also
 10mm caliber
 .40 S&W
 10mm Auto
 .41 Action Express
 List of cartridges by caliber
 Table of handgun and rifle cartridges

References

External links

 38 WCF | 38-40 caliber
 Reloading .38 WCF for Rifles
 The .38-40 Winchester (.38 WCF)
 The .38-40 - The ‘Frontier Forty’ — A sixgun/levergun natural
 
 current 2019 Feb approved saami cartridge specifications #4, CENTER FIRE RIFLE, 2015/12/14 PDF, page 136 (148)

Pistol and rifle cartridges
Dual-purpose handgun/rifle cartridges
Winchester Repeating Arms Company cartridges